"Hammer into Anvil" is an episode of the allegorical British science fiction TV series, The Prisoner. It was written by Roger Woddis and directed by Pat Jackson and twelfth produced. It was the tenth episode to be broadcast in the UK on ITV (ATV Midlands and Grampian) on Friday 1 December 1967 and first aired in the United States on CBS on Saturday 31 August 1968.

The episode stars Patrick McGoohan as Number Six and features as Number Two  Patrick Cargill. The central themes of this episode are insecurity, paranoia, and conspiracy thinking in a leader.

Plot summary
Number Two interrogates a stubborn female prisoner, Number Seventy-Three, in the Village Hospital. Frustrated, he attacks her; she screams, and Number Six rushes to her aid. The commotion allows her to leap from her bed and kill herself by jumping out the first-floor window. Number Six swears to Number Two that he will pay for his cruelty.

Number Two forcibly has Number Six brought to the Green Dome and the two begin a war of nerves. Number Two quotes Goethe: Du mußt Amboß oder Hammer sein ("You must be Anvil or Hammer"). "And you see me as the anvil?" asks Number Six, to which Number Two answers "Precisely. I am going to hammer you." Already aware that he is being watched by the Village's hidden camera and spies at every turn, Number Six proceeds to act in a highly suspicious manner, as if he were some sort of spy or double agent. He takes six copies of the same record of Bizet's L'Arlésienne suite at the music store and plays them, eyeing his watch. He then writes out a message, that Number Fourteen retrieves a copy of, which claims to be from "D-6" to "XO4." Number Two is convinced that Number Six is a plant.

Number Two and Number Fourteen follow Number Six to where he drops a document in the cabin of the stone boat. They retrieve it, but the pages are all blank. After having them tested, Two suspects the technician of working with Number Six. Number Six then goes to place an ad (a quotation from Don Quixote) in the next issue of the Tally Ho. He then calls the head of Psychiatrics, posing as a superior who wants a report on Number Two's mental state. Two monitors the call and starts to become more paranoid at the behaviour of Number Six and those around him. Later, Six asks the town band to play the Farandole from the same Bizet piece, and when the band starts playing, he promptly leaves so that he is not around to hear it. He leaves a fake message in a dead drop that is from a deceased person, wishing him a happy birthday.

Number Two becomes increasingly agitated, wishing he could get away with killing Number Six. Number Fourteen offers to do so, making it appear an accident, and challenges Number Six to a game of "kosho" – a Japanese, trampoline-based contact sport – but is unable to "accidentally" drown his opponent. Number Six leaves a cuckoo clock in front of Number Two's door, causing him to panic and summon a bomb squad. Six captures a pigeon, attaches a message to its leg and sets it free in the woods. The bird is intercepted by Number Two's forces, and Two sees that the message states that Six will send a visual signal the next morning.
Six goes to the beach and sends a visual signal (in light-flash Morse code) – a nursery rhyme with no apparent hidden meaning, all witnessed by Two.

Later, Number Six is able to trick Number Two into believing that Number Fourteen is conspiring against him. When the other keepers of the village cannot discern the hidden meaning in Number Six's messages, Number Two suspects everyone working for him of being part of a conspiracy. Number Fourteen fights with Number Six, who throws him out of a window. In the end, Number Six confronts an unnerved and agitated Number Two, who expresses the belief that Number Six is really "D-6", a man sent by "XO4" to test his security. Feeding on Number Two's paranoia, Number Six charges Number Two with treason: if Number Two's belief was true, then he would be duty-bound not to interfere. At Number Six's suggestion, Number Two calls the hotline to Number One to report his own failures and ask that he be replaced.

Cast

 Patrick Cargill . . . Number Two
 Victor Maddern . . . Band Master
 Basil Hoskins . . . Number Fourteen
 Norman Scace . . . Psychiatric director
 Derek Aylward . . . New supervisor
 Hilary Dwyer . . . Number Seventy-Three
 Arthur Gross . . . Control room supervisor
 Peter Swanwick . . . Supervisor
 Victor Woolf . . . Shop assistant
 Michael Segal . . . Laboratory technician
 Margo Andrew . . . Shop kiosk girl
 Susan Sheers . . . Female code expert
 Jackie Cooper, Fred Haggerty, Eddie Powell, George Leech . . . Guardians

Notes

 Several key exterior scenes featuring Patrick McGoohan were filmed on location in Portmeirion. None of the other principal actors in this episode appear in actual location footage, although a double is used for Number Fourteen in some location scenes.
 Patrick Cargill, who plays Number Two, also appears in the episode "Many Happy Returns" as Thorpe. It is left ambiguous as to whether or not it is the same character.
 This is one of few episodes where Number Six makes no attempt to escape the Village, or resist its attempts to control or condition him. Instead, he subverts its close monitoring of his behaviour, movements and actions to drive the increasingly paranoid Number Two to breaking point.
The fictional martial art of "kosho" was devised for the prior episode "It's Your Funeral". It involves a contest between two helmeted combatants who spring at each other from two trampolines between which is a tank of water. (There is in fact a real martial art called "Kosho Shorei Ryu Kempo".) Although "It's Your Funeral" was the eighth episode produced, and "Hammer Into Anvil" the twelfth, some of the kosho footage from the latter episode appears in the previous one, as despite the quick edits some shots of Number Six's opponent are clearly that of Number Fourteen, played by Basil Hoskins. 
Among the other records seen in the shop are Four Saints in Three Acts, an opera written by American composer Virgil Thomson in the 1920s for an all black cast (ground breaking at the time); Beyond the Sea by Frank Chacksfield, an English big band and easy listening conductor; and a record by Annie Fischer, a Hungarian-Jewish classical pianist who fled to Sweden to escape the Nazis.
One of Number Six's provocations is publishing a Spanish quotation from Don Quixote. He says, Y mas mal in Aldea que se suena, but the actual quote from Miguel de Cervantes's novel is, Hay mas mal en el aldehuela que se suena ["There is more evil in the little village than is heard"].  The newspaper saleswoman, however, reading the quotation that Six has written on a slip of paper, begins with "Hay," and charges him for nine words, the length of the correct Spanish quotation.
When Number Six says "And you see me as the anvil?" he is apparently aware (and Number Two apparently is not) of the George Orwell quote: "It is always the anvil that breaks the hammer, never the other way about."

Broadcast
The broadcast date of the episode varied in different ITV regions of the UK. The episode was first shown at 7:30pm on Friday 1 December 1967 on ATV Midlands and Grampian Television, on Friday 8 December on Anglia Television, on Sunday 10 December on ATV London, whose broadcasts were also taken up by Southern Television, Westward Television and Tyne-Tees; on Thursday 14 December on Scottish Television, on Thursday 21 December on Border Television and on Friday 29 December on Granada Television in the North West. The aggregate viewing figures for the ITV regions that debuted the season in 1967 have been estimated at 9.1 million. In Northern Ireland, the episode did not debut until Saturday 9 March 1968, and in Wales, the episode was not broadcast until Wednesday 11 March 1970.

Sources
  – script of episode

References

External links
 

The Prisoner episodes
1967 British television episodes
Television episodes directed by Pat Jackson

fr:Le Marteau et l'Enclume (Le Prisonnier)